Mou Pengfei (Chinese: 牟鹏飞; pinyin: Móu Péngfēi; born 28 February 1989 in Qingdao) is a Chinese footballer who currently plays for Shenyang Urban in the China League One.

Club career
Mou joined Qingdao Hailifeng's youth academy when he was still a schoolboy. He was promoted to Qingdao Hailifeng's first squad in 2007. On 27 October 2007, he made his senior debut in the last match of 2007 China League One season which Qingdao Hailifeng beat Yanbian FC 1–0. He mainly played as a back-up goalkeeper for Sun Mingqin in Qingdao Hailifeng and became the first choice goalkeeper after Sun injured in the middle of 2009. On 2 September 2009, he was involved in "Chip Shot Gate" (吊射门) incident, in which Qingdao Hailifeng players tried to score a chip own-goal in the last few minutes of the match when they leading Sichuan FC 3–0. The president of Qingdao Hailifeng bet on Qingdao's victory as long as there were no fewer than four goals in the match on an overseas gambling website, however, Mou stopped his teammates' own goal attempt three times as the match finished at 3–0. In February 2010, Qingdao Hailifeng was banned from all future national matches organised by the Chinese Football Association for match-fixing scandal. Mou and his teammates turned to be unattached players. He signed a contract with Chinese Super League side Shaanxi Renhe in March 2010.

In 2010 season, Mou played as the third choice goalkeeper after Shen Jun and Wu Yansheng and didn't play for Shaanxi. He returned to Qingdao and signed a contract with another Super League club Qingdao Jonoon in early 2011. On 4 May 2011, he made his debut for Qingdao Jonoon in the first round of 2011 Chinese FA Cup which Qingdao lost to China League One club Guangdong Sunray Cave 6–5 in the penalty shootout. On 23 June 2012, he made his Super League debut in a 3–2 away victory against Guangzhou R&F, coming on as a substitute for injury Liu Zhenli in the 6th minute. Mou made an impressive act in the match and became the first choice goalkeeper after this match. He played 16 matches in the 2012 league season. Mou became the second choice goalkeeper in 2014 after Qingdao Jonoon relegated to the second-tier. He was demoted to the reserve squad in 2016 when he refused to extend his contract with the club.

In March 2017, Mou transferred to China League Two side Heilongjiang Lava Spring. He was the first choice goalkeeper of the club in the 2017 season as Heilongjiang who the title of the league and promoted to the second-tier. Mou appeared in every minute of the 2018 league season, playing in all 30 games which secured Heilongjiang's stay in the top flight for the next season. He won the Goalkeeper of the Season (League One) in November 2018.

On 27 February 2019, Mou returned to Renhe which had changed their name as Beijing Renhe in the Chinese Super League.

Career statistics 
Statistics accurate as of match played 31 December 2020.

References

External links
 

1989 births
Living people
Association football goalkeepers
Chinese footballers
Footballers from Qingdao
Beijing Renhe F.C. players
Qingdao Hainiu F.C. (1990) players
Heilongjiang Ice City F.C. players
Liaoning Shenyang Urban F.C. players
Chinese Super League players
China League One players
China League Two players